The Dish & the Spoon is a 2011 American film directed by Alison Bagnall, starring Greta Gerwig, Olly Alexander, Eleonore Hendricks and Amy Seimetz.

Plot
Rose (Greta Gerwig) leaves her cheating husband (Adam Rottenberg) and runs into a boy (Olly Alexander), in a desolate beachside building at a boarded-up beach town in Delaware in the fall. He has been dumped by a girl he had traveled from England to be with.

Rose takes him along with her, and in a series of quirky vignettes, she and the boy learn how to fish, cast a rod, dance, get drunk, dress up, have their wedding picture taken, get in a fight, and share a kiss.

Initially they coincide in a forlorn lighthouse and Rose tries to get him to a hospital, but later she drags him along as she looks to confront her former friend Emma (Eleonore Hendricks), for betraying her with her husband. They first go to a beer bottling plant where Emma used to work, they then go to her parents' summer house. The rest of the day, she leaves him there while she awaits Emma at her home.

He puts up with odd role play scenarios. Other than the hunting down of the cheater, he is at Rose's side as she screams down the line at her cheating husband. He allows her to dress him up as a woman so she can play the part of the macho male.

They spend the following morning on a fishing boat, catching a large fish. The following day they have a vintage photo taken of them in wedding clothes, as her fantasy the previous night was of their getting married and having 10 kids who look like him. She essentially finishes their dream relationship when she shows him her future burial plot. He gets them costumes to participate in a country dance held that Sunday, where she is able to physically confront Emma.

Together they learn what everyone in a seasonal town already knows: the seasons change; and, this too shall pass.

Cast
 Greta Gerwig as Rose
 Olly Alexander as Boy
 Eleonore Hendricks as Emma
 Amy Seimetz as Emma's Friend
 Adam Rothenberg as Rose's Husband
 Dan Seely as the Cashier
 Sam Calagione as the Brewery Manager
 H.D. Parsons as the Fisherman

References

External links

2011 films
2011 romantic comedy-drama films
American romantic comedy-drama films
2010s English-language films
2010s American films